Tuqtuqucha Punta (Quechua tuqtu broody hen, qucha lake, punta peak; ridge; first, before, in front of, "hen lake peak", also spelled Tuctococha Punta) is a mountain in the Andes of Peru which reaches a height of approximately . It is located in the Huánuco Region, Huánuco Province, Santa María del Valle District, and in the Yarowilca Province, on the border of the districts of Aparicio Pomares and Chavinillo. It lies north of a lake named Tuqtuqucha.

References

Mountains of Peru
Mountains of Huánuco Region